"Black Suits Comin' (Nod Ya Head)" is a song by American actor and hip hop musician Will Smith. The song was a part of the film Men in Black II's soundtrack and the first single on Smith's album Born to Reign.

Background
The song was written for the 2002 Columbia Pictures action-comedy film Men in Black II, in which Smith portrays Agent J. The song was released as a single from the Men in Black II soundtrack on May 13, 2002. The single reached number 77 on the US Billboard Hot 100, but was more successful in the UK, peaking at number three on the UK Singles Chart. The song features vocals from Trā-Knox, who performs part of the hook in the chorus. In 2017, Limp Bizkit guitarist Wes Borland revealed that he had been approached by Smith to help compose the theme for Men In Black II, but he turned down the offer.

Music video
The music video for "Black Suits Comin' (Nod Ya Head)" features footage of Smith performing onstage in a Men in Black II environment, featuring characters and footage from the movie. It is notable that a scene that was deleted from the final cut of the film appears in a montage sequence in the video. Smith's oldest son, Trey, and actress Meagan Good make cameos. The video was directed by Francis Lawrence, produced by Joseph Sassone and first aired on the June 3, 2002, episode of MTV show Making the Video.

Track listings

 US 12-inch single
A1. "Black Suits Comin' (Nod Ya Head)" (radio edit)  – 3:50
A2. "Black Suits Comin' (Nod Ya Head)" (album version)  – 4:20
A3. "Black Suits Comin' (Nod Ya Head)" (instrumental)  – 4:21
B1. "Nod Ya Head"   – 3:45
B2. "MIB2 Remix"  – 3:45
B3. "Black Suits Comin' (Nod Ya Head)" (a cappella)  – 4:06

 UK CD1
 "Black Suits Comin' (Nod Ya Head)" (radio edit)  – 3:50
 "Nod Ya Head"   – 3:45
 "MIB2 Remix" (album version)  – 3:45

 UK CD2
 "Black Suits Comin' (Nod Ya Head)" (album version)  – 4:20
 "Men in Black" (album version)  – 3:47
 "Miami" (album version)  – 3:18

 UK cassette single
 "Black Suits Comin' (Nod Ya Head)" (radio edit)  – 3:50
 "Men in Black" (album version)  – 3:47

 European CD1
 "Black Suits Comin' (Nod Ya Head)" (album version)  – 4:20
 "MIB2 Remix" (album version)  – 3:45

 European CD2
 "Black Suits Comin' (Nod Ya Head)" (album version)  – 4:20
 "MIB2 Remix" (album version)  – 3:45
 "Nod Ya Head"   – 3:45
 "Black Suits Comin' (Nod Ya Head)" (instrumental)  – 4:21

 European 12-inch single
A1. "MIB2 Remix" (album version)  – 3:45
A2. "Black Suits Comin' (Nod Ya Head)" (album version)  – 4:20
B1. "Nod Ya Head"   – 3:45
B2. "Black Suits Comin' (Nod Ya Head)" (instrumental)  – 4:21

 Australian CD single
 "Black Suits Comin' (Nod Ya Head)" (radio edit)  – 3:50
 "Nod Ya Head"   – 3:45
 "Black Suits Comin' (Nod Ya Head)" (album version)  – 4:20
 "Black Suits Comin' (Nod Ya Head)" (instrumental)  – 4:21

Personnel
 Will Smith – vocals, production, mixing
 Mark Sparks – production
 Rob Chiarelli – production, mixing, engineering
 Neff-U – additional production
 Lance Bennett - Writing

Charts

Weekly charts

Year-end charts

Certifications

Release history

References

2001 songs
2002 singles
Columbia Records singles
Music videos directed by Francis Lawrence
Songs from Men in Black (franchise)
Songs written by Theron Feemster
Songs written by Will Smith
Songs written for films
Will Smith songs